Cadherin EGF LAG seven-pass G-type receptor 1 also known as flamingo homolog 2 or cadherin family member 9  is a protein that in humans is encoded by the CELSR1 gene.

Function 

The protein encoded by this gene is a member of the flamingo subfamily, part of the cadherin superfamily. The flamingo subfamily consists of nonclassic-type cadherins; a subpopulation that does not interact with catenins. The flamingo cadherins are located at the plasma membrane and have nine cadherin domains, seven epidermal growth factor-like repeats and two laminin G-like domains in their ectodomain. They also have seven transmembrane domains, a characteristic unique to this subfamily. It is postulated that these proteins are receptors involved in contact-mediated communication, with cadherin domains acting as homophilic binding regions and the EGF-like domains involved in cell adhesion and receptor-ligand interactions. This particular member is a developmentally regulated, neural-specific gene which plays an unspecified role in early embryogenesis.

See also
 Flamingo (protein)

References

External links

Further reading

Adhesion G protein-coupled receptors
Chemokine receptors